Eola may refer to:
 Eola, Illinois
 Eola, Oregon
 Eola-Amity Hills AVA, Oregon wine region
 Eola, Texas
 Lake Eola, Orlando, Florida
 Aeolian processes, the process of wind activity
 End of Life Announcement is a milestone in Product Life Cycle